Anne Robertson Johnson Cockrill (February 10, 1757–October 13, 1821) was an American pioneer. She became the first woman to receive a land grant in Tennessee.

Early life
Anne Robertson Johnson Cockrill was born on February 10, 1757, in Wake County, North Carolina. Her brother, James Robertson (1742-1814), founded Fort Nashborough alongside John Donelson (1718–1785).

Adult life
She moved to Fort Watauga in North Carolina, and later moved to Fort Caswell. When it was attacked by Native Americans, she led a group of women to throw boiling water at them to ward them off.

Her first husband was a justice of the peace in the Washington District of East Tennessee and was killed in an accident. After he died, Cockrill and her three small daughters joined Colonel John Donelson in the migration of the first pioneers on a flatboat to go down the Cumberland River to Tennessee to the Cumberland settlements. The exhibition was intended to bring families of the men who settled Nashville there. During the journey, she taught the children in the boat to make small wooden boxes, filling them with river sand, and drawing letters and numbers in the sand. She was later honored as Middle Tennessee’s first teacher.

In 1784, she received a land grant for 640-acre from the North Carolina legislature; she was the first woman in this position. The land was then known as Cockrill Springs and was situated on what is now Centennial Park in Nashville, Tennessee, near the campus of Vanderbilt University. There is now a monument in her memory there.

Anne and John married in 1784 and had eight children.

Death
She died on October 13, 1821, in Tennessee. She was buried in the Nashville City Cemetery.

Further reading 
Lewis, Peyton Cockrill. A Perilous Journey: The Founding of Nashville, Tennessee, 1780-1781 (2005) Channing Press

References

External links

1757 births
1821 deaths
People from Wake County, North Carolina
People from Nashville, Tennessee
People of pre-statehood Tennessee
Burials in Tennessee